Tenaya Capital is a venture capital firm with offices in Portola Valley, California, and Wellesley, Massachusetts. Founded in 1995 as Lehman Brothers Venture Partners, Tenaya spun out to become an independent firm in 2009 following Lehman's bankruptcy. It opened its seventh fund in 2015. In 2009 the firm had approximately $750 million under management.

Lehman Brothers bankruptcy and LBVP spin out

On September 15, 2008, Lehman Brothers filed for bankruptcy protection. As part of the liquidation process, Lazard was appointed to sell certain interests in Lehman Brothers Venture Partners and its other private investment units.

In January 2009, HarbourVest Partners, a Boston private equity fund of funds, financed the spinout of Tenaya, acquiring Lehman's existing investment and unfunded commitments to Tenaya venture funds.

See also
Lehman Brothers Merchant Banking

References

External links
Tenaya Capital (company website)

Companies based in Menlo Park, California
Privately held companies based in California
Venture capital firms of the United States
Lehman Brothers
Financial services companies established in 1995